Dolores Gurgenovna Kondrashova (24 November 1936 – 23 January 2023) was a Soviet and Russian hairdresser and designer. She was an honored "Art Worker" of the Russian Federation (2002), and an honored worker of consumer services of the population of the Russian Federation (1987).

Biography
Dolores Kondrashova was the daughter of Gurgen Terteryan, theater-director of the concert association of Baku. After the death of her father, she, along with her mother and sister, arrived in Moscow. There she became interested in and devoted herself to the art of hairdressing.

From 1971 to 1989, she was head of the Laboratory of Hair Modeling at the Ministry of Consumer Services. From 1971 until her retirement, she was the head coach of hairdressing team of Russia. In 1998 at the hairdressing world championship Hairworld in Seoul, the Russian team won the world championship title for the first time.

At the Congress of the World Organization of Hairdressers (OMC), held in the summer of 2006, Kondrashova was re-elected president of the OMC Eastern European Zone.

She was married to process engineer Iosif Goldman (1937 – 2020).

Awards 
 Order of the Badge of Honour (1971)
 Order of the Red Banner of Labour (1976)
 Medal "Veteran of Labour" (1990)
 Order of Friendship (1997)
 Medal "In Commemoration of the 850th Anniversary of Moscow"
 Order of Honour (2009)
 Legion of Honour

References

External links
 Official website
 Академия парикмахерского искусства «Долорес» 
 Кто стрижёт и одевает первых лиц России? 

1936 births
2023 deaths
People from Baku
Commandeurs of the Légion d'honneur
Recipients of the Order of Honour (Russia)
Recipients of the Order of the Red Banner of Labour
Businesspeople from Baku
Fashion stylists
Russian hairdressers
Russian women fashion designers
Soviet designers
20th-century Russian businesswomen
20th-century Russian businesspeople
21st-century Russian businesswomen
21st-century Russian businesspeople
Russian people of Armenian descent